In France, an  (transport organisation authority), usually abbreviated AOT, is one of the local government bodies implementing the 1982 law for the organisation of transportation in France.

Such an organisation may either run public transport services itself (a ) or contract them out other bodies such as private companies (a ).

This can create difficulties in co-ordinating timetables, service frequencies and fares. Sometimes this is sorted out by creating a joint syndicate body to which the several AOTs delegate their authority.

See also 

Autorité organisatrice de transport urbain, a type of AOT for urban areas

References

External links 

 
 Society of French AOTs
 Independent public transport

Public transport in France
Transport law in France